Kunst im Tunnel or KIT is a contemporary art museum in Düsseldorf. It is the new exhibition space of Kunsthalle Düsseldorf, located within the Rheinufertunnel - hence the name. It has an underground exhibition area of 850m².

References

Art museums and galleries in Germany
Museums in Düsseldorf
Art museums established in 2007
2007 establishments in Germany